DD/MM/YYYY (pronounced "day month year") was a Canadian experimental rock band from Toronto, Ontario, Canada. They were known for their abstract music, use of unconventional instruments, use of complex time signatures, and their rotating member roles.

The nature of DD/MM/YYYY's music was explained as "a mess of spastic, specially challenged art rock with jagged, diamondback guitars, '80s video game synthesizers, and drums that roll with all the punches of the discordant dreamy vocals" and self-described as "always changing and always moving"

Career
The band was formed from ex-members of Toronto bands Plant the Bomb, The Viking Club and The Newfound Interest in Connecticut.

On 17 March 2009, DD/MM/YYYY released their third and final album, Black Square. The album garnered much national, and international press for the band. The Canadian Dose Magazine gave it 4/5 stars and described the album along its enigmatic terms saying: "Black Square bends time and space, trapping you in a dense mesh of punk noise and math rock that will stay imprinted in your neural pathways long after the album’s final coda." The band also embarked on two 5-week European tours and two 60-date North American tours in support of the album.

DD/MM/YYYY toured with Crystal Castles, Don Caballero, sBACH, These Arms Are Snakes, and Japanther. They've also performed at South by South West Music Festival in Austin, Texas three times (2008, 2009, and 2010).

In 2010, the band traveled to Hong Kong to play at the Music Matters conference.

The band was chosen by Portishead to perform at the ATP I'll Be Your Mirror festivals they curated in July at London's Alexandra Palace and in September in Asbury Park, New Jersey.

DD/MM/YYYY played their final show on 11 November 2011 at 918 Bathurst Centre in Toronto. On 17 November, four of the five members debuted their new band Absolutely Free at the M For Montreal Festival.

Members
Mike Claxton — bass guitar, synthesizers, clarinet
Tomas Del Balso — vocals, guitars, drums
Jordan Holmes — synthesizers, guitars
Matt King — vocals, synthesizers, drums, saxophone
Moshe Rozenberg — drums, synthesizers

Discography

Studio albums
Blue Screen of Death (2005, We Are Busy Bodies)
Are They Masks? (2007, We Are Busy Bodies)
Black Square (2008, We Are Busy Bodies, Invada Records)

Singles
Imagine! from Are They Masks? Music video by Humble Empire Imagine! 
Infinity Skull Cube from Black Square Music video by Jesi The Elder
Digital Haircut from "Black Square" Music Video by Humble Empire
I'm Still In The Wall from "Black Square" Music Video by Exploding Motor Car

Television Appearances
MTV Live Canada
Dutch National TV (NOS)

References

External links
Official DD/MM/YYYY Website
Profile on CBC Radio 3

Musical groups established in 2003
Canadian indie rock groups
Canadian art rock groups
Canadian experimental musical groups
Musical groups from Toronto
Musical groups disestablished in 2011
2003 establishments in Ontario
2011 disestablishments in Ontario